Horace C. Alger (April 15, 1857September 28, 1906) was an American politician who served in the Wyoming House of Representatives in 1895 and was the Democratic Party nominee for governor in 1898. He was defeated by DeForest Richards.

Early life
Alger was born on April 15, 1857, in Lowell, Massachusetts. In 1879 he graduated from Harvard University. In 1885, he moved to Sheridan, Wyoming, then a small town of roughly 100 people.

Political career
In 1894, Alger was one of three Democrats elected to the Wyoming House of Representatives. He served during the 1895 legislature. In 1898, he was the Democratic nominee for Governor of Wyoming. He was defeated by seven percentage points to DeForest Richards.

Death
Alger died on September 28, 1906 in Sheridan, Wyoming. His funeral was attended by about 2,000 people which was a large portion of the population of Sheridan.

References

1857 births
1906 deaths
Harvard University alumni
Democratic Party members of the Wyoming House of Representatives
People from Lowell, Massachusetts
19th-century American politicians